Bukola Samuel-Wemimo (née Coker) is a media personality and Nigerian journalist. She is a news anchor at Channels TV. Before moving to Channels TV, she was the host of a political TV Show Fireworks,  at TVC News.

Education 
Samuel-Wemimo attended St Mary's Private School, Lagos for her primary education, had her secondary education at  Abeokuta Girls Grammar School, Ogun State and her tertiary education at Lagos State University where she earned a Bachelor of Arts degree in History and International Studies.

Career 
Samuel-Wemimo started her broadcasting career as an undergraduate at Lagos Television in 2001 and moved to TVC News in 2006. At TVC News, she doubled as a reporter and TV presenter, hosting a Fireworks and Journalist Hangout. In 2021, Samuel-Wemimo joined Channels TV as a news anchor. On December 30, 2020, she was detained by operatives of the Department of State Services.

Award 
In 2017, Samuel-Wemimo won City People Awards For Excellence  as TV Presenter of the year. In 2019, She was nominated as Television Programme Presenter of the Year at the 27th edition of the Nigeria Media Merit Award but lost the position to Seun Okinbaloye of Channels TV. She got a Commendation Award for her report on Depression and Suicide at 14th Wole Soyinka Award for Investigative Reporting and went ahead to win the 15th Wole Soyinka award for Investigative reporting Television Category in 2020 for her report on sexual abuse and how police cog the wheels of justice. In 2021, she was one of the 21 female journalists selected for training on identifying and reporting sexual and gender-based violence issues (SGBV) by The Wole Soyinka Centre for Investigative Journalism (WSCIJ).

References 

Year of birth missing (living people)
Living people
Nigerian women journalists
Lagos State University alumni
Television personalities from Lagos